The 2014 Big Ten softball tournament was held at Sharon J. Drysdale Field on the campus of Northwestern University in Evanston, Illinois from May 8 through May 10, 2014. As the tournament winner, Minnesota earned the Big Ten Conference's automatic bid to the 2014 NCAA Division I softball tournament.

Tournament

Schedule

All-Tournament Team
 Alex Booker (Illinois)
 Tori Chiodo (Purdue)
 Caitlin Conrad (Ohio State)
 Andrea Filler (Northwestern)
 Mary Massei (Wisconsin)
 Stephanie Peace (Wisconsin)
 Sierra Romero (Michigan)
 Caitlin Blanchard (Michigan)
 Lindsay Montemarano (Michigan)
 Sara Moulton (Minnesota)
 Tyler Walker (Minnesota)

Tournament MVP
 Kaitlyn Richardson (Minnesota)

References

2014 Big Ten Conference softball season
Big Ten Tournament
Big Ten softball tournament